A Voice from the Town is a poem by Australian writer and poet Andrew Barton "Banjo" Paterson. It was first published in The Bulletin magazine on 20 October 1894.

In Up The Country, Lawson had criticised "The City Bushman" such as Banjo Paterson who tended to romanticise bush life. Paterson, in turn, accused Lawson of representing bush life as nothing but doom and gloom, famously ending with the line "For the bush will never suit you, and you'll never suit the bush." 

This exchange sparked what is known as the Bulletin Debate, mainly between Paterson and Lawson, but also including Edward Dyson and Francis Kenna.

This poem appeared two years after "The Poets of the Tomb" by Henry Lawson, the previous poem in the debate, and brought the exercise to an end. An author's note stated that it had been written in response to the 1871 poem "A Voice from the Bush", written by Mowbray Morris.

Further publications

 The Man from Snowy River and Other Verses by Banjo Paterson (1895)
 Singer of the Bush, A. B. (Banjo) Paterson : Complete Works 1885-1900 edited by Rosamund Campbell and Philippa Harvie (1983)
 A Vision Splendid : The Complete Poetry of A. B. 'Banjo' Paterson (1990)

See also
 1894 in poetry
 1894 in literature
 1894 in Australian literature
 Australian literature

References 

1894 poems
Poetry by Banjo Paterson
Bulletin Debate
Works originally published in The Bulletin (Australian periodical)